JS Pictures is a South Korean actor management and Korean drama production company, founded in 1999 by the director and producer Lee Jin-seok. It currently operates as a subsidiary of CJ ENM.

Works

Managed people

Actors
 Geum Chae-Ahn
 Yoon Hyun-min
 Lee Da-hae
 Yoon So-yi
 Ahn Woo-yeon
 So Hee-jung
 Yoon Jin-seul (former member of Jewelry)
 Park Eun-suk
 Park Seo-yeon
 Jo Sung-yoon
 Kim Bitnari
 Park Shin-woo

Production crew

Producers
 Kim Do-hoon
 Kim Sang-ho
 Kim Byung-soo
 Kwon Seok-jang
 Kim Yoon-cheol
 Ahn Pan-seok
 Lee Min-woo
 Lee Jong-jae
 Lee Chang-han
 Lee Tae-gon
 Lee Jin-seok

Screenwriters
 Kim Hyun-hee
 Kim Jung-eun
 Ma Joo-hee
 Baek Mi-kyung
 Yang Jin-ah
 Lee Ji-hyo
 Lee Jin-mae
 Go Jung-won
 Jung Ha-na

See also
 Studio Dragon - another drama production subsidiary of CJ ENM

References

External links
  

Television production companies of South Korea
Companies based in Seoul
Mass media companies established in 1999
South Korean companies established in 1999
CJ E&M
CJ Group subsidiaries